Rafael Llano Cifuentes (18 February 1933 – 28 November 2017) was a Mexican-born Brazilian Roman Catholic prelate.

Born in Mexico City and raised in Brazil, Llano Cifuentes was ordained to the priesthood in 1959, and as a bishop in 1990. He served as the Bishop of Nova Friburgo from 2004 until his retirement in 2010. He died on 28 November 2017 in Tijuca, Rio de Janeiro, at the age of 84.

References

External links
 Rafael Llano Cifuentes at Catholic-Hierarchy.org

1933 births
2017 deaths
20th-century Roman Catholic bishops in Brazil
People from Mexico City
People from Rio de Janeiro (state)
21st-century Roman Catholic bishops in Brazil
Roman Catholic bishops of São Sebastião do Rio de Janeiro
Roman Catholic bishops of Nova Friburgo